Sagina pilifera is a species of Sagina, native (and endemic) to the Mediterranean islands of Corsica and Sardinia, where it grows in mountains at altitudes of 1,000–2,700 m. It is a prostrate herbaceous plant growing to 2–8 cm tall, with white flowers 1 cm in diameter.

Plants from northwestern Europe reported as this species are based on misidentification of Sagina subulata.

References

pilifera